"I'm Goin' In" is a song by American rapper Lil Wayne. The song features fellow rappers Drake and Young Jeezy, and appears on Drake's EP So Far Gone (2009). The song was written by the trio along with Khari "Needlz" Cain, who produced the song. "I'm Goin' In" was sent to urban contemporary radio as the EP's third and final single on October 27, 2009.

Release
Prior to the official release, a version without Young Jeezy was leaked online. A solo version with just Lil Wayne was also leaked online. "I'm Goin' In" was sent to urban contemporary radio in the United States on October 27, 2009.

Chart performance
The song peaked at number 40 on the US Billboard Hot 100. It also peaked at numbers 28 and 11 respectively on the Billboard Hot R&B/Hip-Hop Songs and Rap Songs charts. The song was later certified platinum by the Recording Industry Association of America (RIAA) for sales of over a million copies.

Charts

Certifications

References

2009 songs
2009 singles
Lil Wayne songs
Jeezy songs
Drake (musician) songs
Songs written by Drake (musician)
Songs written by Lil Wayne
Songs written by Jeezy
Songs written by Needlz
Cash Money Records singles
Motown singles
Song recordings produced by Needlz